Cooch Behar Dakshin  Assembly constituency is an assembly constituency in Cooch Behar district in the Indian state of West Bengal.

Overview
As per orders of the Delimitation Commission, No. 4  Cooch Behar Dakshin Assembly constituency covers Cooch Behar municipality and Chandamari, Chilkirhat, Falimari, Ghughumari, Haribhanga, Moyamari, Patchhara, Putimari Fuleswari and Suktabari gram panchayats of Cooch Behar I community development block.

Cooch Behar Dakshin Assembly constituency is part of No. 1 Cooch Behar (Lok Sabha constituency) (SC).

Members of Legislative Assembly

Election results

2021

2016
In the 2016 election, Mihir Goswami of AITC defeated his nearest rival Debasis Banik of AIFB

2011
In the 2011 election, Akshay Thakur of AIFB defeated his nearest rival Abdul Jalil Ahmed of Trinamool Congress.

1977 – 2006: Cooch Behar North constituency
Contests in most years were multi cornered but only winners and runners are being mentioned. In the 2006 and 2001 state assembly elections Dipak Chandra Sarkar of Forward Bloc defeated Mihir Goswami of Trinamool Congress. Mihir Goswami representing Congress had defeated Aparajita Goppi of Forward Bloc in 1996. Bimal Kanti Basu of Forward Bloc defeated Mihir Goswami of Congress in 1991. Aparajita Goppi of Forward Bloc defeated Mihir Goswami of Congress in 1987, Sunil Kar of Congress in 1982 and Bimal Chandra Dhar of Congress in 1977.

1977 – 2006: Cooch Behar West constituency
In the 2006 and 2001 state assembly elections, Akshay Thakur of Forward Bloc won the Cooch Behar West seat defeating Abdul Jalil Ahmed and Soumendra Chandra Das (both of Trinamool Congress) respectively. Soumindra Chandra Das of Forward Bloc defeated Abdul Jalil Ahmed representing Congress in 1996 and Ramkrishna Pal of Congress in 1991. Bimal Kanti Basu of Forward Bloc defeated Shyamal Choudhury of Congress in 1987 and 1982, and Maqsudar Rahman of Congress in 1977.

1962-1972: Cooch Behar North, South and West constituencies
Sunil Kar of Congress won the Cooch Behar North in 1972 and 1971. Bimal Kanti Basu of Forward Bloc won it in 1969. M.R.Tar of Congress won it in 1967. Sunil Dasgupta of Forward Bloc won it in 1962. Santosh Kumar Roy of Congress won the Cooch Behar South seat in 1972, 1971, 1969 and 1967. Sunil Basunia of Forward Bloc won the seat in 1962. Rajani Das of Congress won the Cooch Behar West seat in 1972 and 1971. Prasenjit Barman of Congress won it in 1969 and 1967. The seat was not there prior to 1967.

1951 & 1957: Cooch Behar constituency
Cooch Behar was a joint seat in 1957. It was won by  Maziruddin Ahmed and Satish Chandra Roy Singha (both of Congress). In independent India's first election in 1951, Maziruddin Ahmed and Jatindra Nath Singha Sarkar (both of Congress) won the Cooch Behar joint seat.

References

Assembly constituencies of West Bengal
Politics of Cooch Behar district